Stethobaris is a genus of flower weevils in the beetle family Curculionidae. There are about 25 described species in Stethobaris.

Species
These 16 species have been found in North America:

 Stethobaris arizonica Casey, 1920
 Stethobaris cerpheroides Prena & O'Brien, 2011
 Stethobaris cicatricosa Casey, 1893
 Stethobaris collaris Casey, 1920
 Stethobaris corpulenta LeConte, 1876
 Stethobaris egregia Casey, 1892
 Stethobaris hybris Prena & O'Brien, 2011
 Stethobaris incompta Casey, 1892
 Stethobaris laevimargo (Champion, 1916)
 Stethobaris nemesis Prena & O'Brien, 2011
 Stethobaris ovata (LeConte, 1868)
 Stethobaris polita (Chevrolat, 1880)
 Stethobaris rufescens Prena & O'Brien, 2011
 Stethobaris sacajaweae Prena, 2017
 Stethobaris sprekeliae Prena & O'Brien, 2011
 Stethobaris ultima Prena & O'Brien, 2011

References

Further reading

 

Baridinae
Articles created by Qbugbot